Standard Fireworks is a company based in Sivakasi, Tamil Nadu, India which manufactures safety matches, firecrackers, and other fireworks.

Standard Fireworks was founded by N. R. K. Rajarathnam in 1942 in the town of Sivakasi. The company started by manufacturing match sticks but later expanded to fireworks.

First directors of standard fireworks are Shri.K.A.A.Sankaralingam, Shri.K.A.A.Arunachalam, Shri.A.Chelladurai and Shri.Yennarkay.R.Ravindran

Standard Fireworks has also established collaborations with China-based manufacturers.

The company's reports a 45% market-share in India and 5% of global exports. Standard Fireworks' Sivakasi facilities are spread over  land, using only 10% of the total land area out of environmental and safety concerns. The company employs over 10,000 personnel.

Notes

External links 
 

Companies based in Tamil Nadu
Fireworks companies
Chemical companies established in 1942
Virudhunagar district
1942 establishments in India
Manufacturing companies of India
Companies based in Sivakasi